Microsoft Developer Network (MSDN) was the division of Microsoft responsible for managing the firm's relationship with developers and testers, such as hardware developers interested in the operating system (OS), and software developers developing on the various OS platforms or using the API or scripting languages of Microsoft's applications. The relationship management is situated in assorted media: web sites, newsletters, developer conferences, trade media, blogs and DVD distribution.

Starting in January 2020, the website is fully integrated with Microsoft Docs.

Websites 
MSDN's primary web presence at msdn.microsoft.com is a collection of sites for the developer community that provide information, documentation, and discussion that is authored both by Microsoft and by the community at large. Recently, Microsoft has placed emphasis on incorporation of forums, blogs, library annotations and social bookmarking to make MSDN an open dialog  with the developer community rather than a one-way service. The main website, and most of its constituent applications below are available in 56 or more languages.

Library 
MSDN Library is a library of official technical documentation intended for independent developers of software for Microsoft Windows. MSDN Library documents the APIs that ship with Microsoft products and also includes sample code, technical articles, and other programming information. The library was freely available on the web, with CDs and DVDs of the most recent materials initially issued quarterly as part of an MSDN subscription. However, since 2006, they can be freely downloaded from Microsoft Download Center in the form of ISO images. 

Visual Studio Express edition integrates only with MSDN Express Library, which is a subset of the full MSDN Library, although either edition of the MSDN Library can be freely downloaded and installed standalone.

In Visual Studio 2010 MSDN Library is replaced with the new Help System, which is installed as a part of Visual Studio 2010 installation. Help Library Manager is used to install Help Content books covering selected topics.

In 2016, Microsoft introduced the new technical documentation platform, Microsoft Docs, intended as a replacement of TechNet and MSDN libraries. Over the next two years, the content of MSDN Library was gradually migrated into Microsoft Docs. Now most of MSDN Library pages redirect to the corresponding Microsoft Docs pages.

Integration with Visual Studio 
Each edition of MSDN Library can only be accessed with one help viewer (Microsoft Document Explorer or other help viewer), which is integrated with the then current single version or sometimes two versions of Visual Studio. In addition, each new version of Visual Studio does not integrate with an earlier version of MSDN. A compatible MSDN Library is released with each new version of Visual Studio and included on Visual Studio DVD. As newer versions of Visual Studio are released, newer editions of MSDN Library do not integrate with older Visual Studio versions and do not even include old/obsolete documentation for deprecated or discontinued products. MSDN Library versions can be installed side-by-side, that is, both the older as well as the newer version of MSDN Library can co-exist.

Forums 
MSDN Forums are the web-based forums used by the community to discuss a wide variety of software development topics. MSDN Forums were migrated to an all-new platform during 2008 that  provided new features designed to improve efficiency such as inline preview of threads, AJAX filtering, and a slide-up post editor.

Blogs 
MSDN blogs is a series of blogs that were hosted under Microsoft's domain blogs.msdn.com. Some blogs are dedicated to a product – e.g. Visual Studio, Internet Explorer, PowerShell – or a version of a product – e.g. Windows 7, Windows 8 – while others belong to a Microsoft employee, e.g. Michael Howard or Raymond Chen.

In May 2020, the MSDN and TechNet blogs were closed and the content was archived at Microsoft Docs.

Social bookmarking 
Social bookmarking on MSDN Social was first launched in 2008, built on a new web platform that has user-tagging and feeds at its core. The goal of the social bookmarking application is to provide a method whereby members of the developer community can:
 Contribute to a database of quality links on any topic from across the web. By filtering on one or more tags, (e.g. ".net" and "database") users can discover popular or recent links and subscribe to a feed of those links.
 Find and follow experts' recommended sites. Each profile page includes a feed of the user's contributions. Users can be discovered through a drop-down menu on each bookmark.
 Demonstrate their expertise through the links displayed in their profile.
 Store their favorite links online.
The initial release of the application provides standard features for the genre, including a bookmarklet and import capabilities. The MSDN web site is also starting to incorporate feeds of social bookmarks from experts and the community, displayed alongside feeds from relevant bloggers.

The social bookmarking feature was discontinued on October 1, 2009.

Gallery 
MSDN Gallery is a repository of community-authored code samples and projects. Launched in 2008, the purpose of the site is still evolving to complement Codeplex, the open-source project hosting site from Microsoft.

Software subscriptions
MSDN has historically offered a subscription package whereby developers have access and licenses to use nearly all Microsoft software that has ever been released to the public. Subscriptions are sold on an annual basis, and cost anywhere from US$1,000 to US$6,000 per year per subscription, as it is offered in several tiers.

Although in most cases the software itself functions exactly like the full product, the MSDN end-user license agreement prohibits use of the software in a business production environment. This is a legal restriction, not a technical one. An exception is made for Microsoft Office, allowing  personal use even for business purposes without a separate license—but only with the "MSDN Premium Subscription" and even so only "directly related to the design, development and test and/or documentation of software projects;" this does not terminate

MSDN Magazine
Microsoft provides the editorial content for MSDN Magazine, a monthly publication. The magazine was created as a merger between Microsoft Systems Journal (MSJ) and Microsoft Internet Developer (MIND) magazines in March 2000.| 

MSJ back issues are available online. MSDN Magazine was available as a print magazine in the United States, and online in 11 languages. The last issue of the magazine was released in November 2019.

Microsoft Systems Journal
Microsoft Systems Journal was a 1986-founded bi-monthly Microsoft magazine.

History 
MSDN was launched in September 1992 as a quarterly, CD-ROM-based compilation of technical articles, sample code, and software development kits. The first two MSDN CD releases (September 1992 and January 1993) were marked as pre-release discs (P1 and P2, respectively). Disc 3, released in April 1993, was the first full release. In addition to CDs, there was a 16-page tabloid newspaper, Microsoft Developer Network News, edited by Andrew Himes, who had previously been the founding editor of MacTech, the premiere Macintosh technology journal. A Level II subscription was added in 1993, that included the MAPI, ODBC, TAPI and VFW SDKs.

MSDN2 was opened in November 2004 as a source for Visual Studio 2005 API information, with noteworthy differences being updated web site code, conforming better to web standards and thus giving a long-awaited improved support for alternative web browsers to Internet Explorer in the API browser. In 2008, the original MSDN cluster was retired and MSDN2 became msdn.microsoft.com.

Dr GUI and the MSDN Writers Team 
In 1996, Bob Gunderson began writing a column in Microsoft Developer Network News, edited by Andrew Himes, using the pseudonym "Dr.GUI". The column provided answers to questions submitted by MSDN subscribers. The caricature of Dr. GUI was based on a photo of Gunderson. When he left the MSDN team, Dennis Crain took over the Dr. GUI role and added medical humor to the column. Upon his departure, Dr. GUI became the composite identity of the original group (most notably Paul Johns) of Developer Technology Engineers that provided in-depth technical articles to the Library. The early members included: Bob Gunderson, Dale Rogerson, Rüdiger R. Asche, Ken Lassesen, Nigel Thompson (a.k.a. Herman Rodent), Nancy Cluts, Paul Johns, Dennis Crain, and Ken Bergmann. Nigel Thompson was the development manager for Windows Multimedia Extensions that originally added multimedia capabilities to Windows. Renan Jeffreis produced the original system (Panda) to publish MSDN on the Internet and in HTML instead of the earlier multimedia viewer engine. Dale Rogerson, Nigel Thompson and Nancy Cluts all published MS Press books while on the MSDN team. As of August 2010, only Dennis Crain and Dale Rogerson remain employed by Microsoft.

See also
DreamSpark
IBM DeveloperWorks
Microsoft TechNet
Microsoft Docs
Oracle Developers
The Code Room

References

External links 
 Official website (Archive)
 Archived MSDN and TechNet Blogs

Microsoft culture
Microsoft websites
Software developer communities